Thunderbolt's Tracks is a 1927 American silent Western film directed by J.P. McGowan and starring Jack Perrin, Pauline Curley and Buzz Barton.

Cast
 Jack Perrin as Sergeant Larry Donovan 
 Pauline Curley as Alice Hayden 
 Buzz Barton as Red Hayden 
 Jack Henderson as Pop Hayden 
 Harry Tenbrook as Corporal Biff Flannagan 
 Ethan Laidlaw as Buck Moulton 
 Ruth Royce as Speedy
 Alfred Hewston as Timekeeper 
 Cliff Lyons as Cafe Customer 
 Lew Meehan as Marshal
 Starlight the Horse as Starlight - Larry's new Horse 
 Rex the Dog as Red's Dog

References

Bibliography
 John J. McGowan. J.P. McGowan: Biography of a Hollywood Pioneer. McFarland, 2005.

External links
 

1927 films
1927 Western (genre) films
Films directed by J. P. McGowan
American black-and-white films
Rayart Pictures films
Silent American Western (genre) films
1920s English-language films
1920s American films